New Hampshire's 1st State Senate district is one of 24 districts in the New Hampshire Senate. It has been represented by Republican Carrie Gendreau since 2022.

Geography
District 1 covers far northern New Hampshire, including the Great North Woods region bordering Canada. It is located entirely within New Hampshire's 2nd congressional district. It borders the states of Maine and Vermont, as well as the Canadian province of Quebec. At over 2,500 square miles, it is the largest state legislative district in New Hampshire.

Coös County - 100% of county

Grafton County - 27% of county

 Littleton
 Bethlehem
 Franconia
 Sugar Hill
 Lisbon
 Lyman
 Monroe
 Bath
 Landaff
 Easton
 Haverhill
 Benton
 Woodstock
 Ellsworth
 Warren
 Piermont
 Romney

Recent election results

2022

Elections prior to 2022 were held under different district lines.

Federal and statewide results in District 1
Results are of elections held under 2022 district lines.

Historical election results

2020

2018

2016

2014

2012

References

1
Coös County, New Hampshire
Carroll County, New Hampshire